Rubberband is the debut album by American country music artist Charlie Worsham. It was released on August 20, 2013 via Warner Bros. Records. Worsham co-wrote all eleven tracks and co-produced the album with Ryan Tyndell. Vince Gill and Marty Stuart appear on the song "Tools of the Trade".

Critical reception
The album received positive reviews from critics. Billy Dukes of Taste of Country gave it 4.5 stars out of 5, saying that "From top to bottom, Worsham never shows the same style or tone twice in a row, making each cut feel original and exciting. " It received an "A" from Tammy Raugsa of Country Weekly, whose review compared the music to Diamond Rio and New Grass Revival, also praising the lyrics and Worsham's voice, which she compared to Vince Gill. She concluded her review with, "It seems unfair to isolate any one track over another since all stand on their own. They’re laudable as much for their unique nature as they are for their honest-to-goodness goodness." Jeffrey B. Remz of Country Standard Time compared Worsham to Keith Urban, but thought that the softer songs showed more of an original sound. He added that "It may not be particularly new, but it is very well done."

Track listing

Personnel
Compiled from liner notes.

Musicians
 Tom Bukovac – electric guitar, acoustic guitar on "Break What's Broken"
 Sheryl Crow – background vocals on "Love Don't Die Easy"
 Madi Diaz – background vocals
 Johnny Duke – electric guitar, acoustic guitar
 Shawn Fichter – drums and percussion on "Break What's Broken"
 Matt Glassmeyer – shuitar
 Vince Gill – resonator guitar and background vocals on "Tools of the Trade"
 Lee Hendricks – bass guitar
 Rebecca Lynn Howard – background vocals on "Tools of the Trade"
 Jedd Hughes – electric guitar, acoustic guitar, mandolin, guitalele
 Jeff Hyde – acoustic guitar
 Eric Masse – background vocals
 Matt Nolen – background vocals
 Adam Popick – bass guitar on "Break What's Broken"
 Marty Stuart – mandolin and background vocals on "Tools of the Trade"
 Ryan Tyndell – background vocals, percussion
 Charlie Worsham – lead vocals, background vocals, electric guitar, acoustic guitar, mandolin, banjo, guitalele, percussion
 Craig Wright – drums, percussion

Technical
 Arturo Buenahora, Jr. – executive production
 Eric Masse – recording
 Andrew Mendelson – mastering
 Justin Niebank – mixing
 Ryan Tyndell – production
 Brian David Willis – digital editing
 Charlie Worsham – production

Chart performance

Album

Singles

References

2013 debut albums
Charlie Worsham albums
Warner Records albums